James Leo Bedard (November 19, 1927 – February 2, 1994) was a Canadian professional ice hockey defenceman who played 22 games in the National Hockey League with the Chicago Black Hawks. He spent the majority of his career with the New Westminster Royals of the Western Hockey League.

References

External links

1927 births
1994 deaths
Canadian ice hockey defencemen
Chicago Blackhawks players
Ice hockey people from Saskatchewan